1949 Albanian Cup was the third season of Albania's annual cup competition. It began in March 1949 with the First Round and ended in May 1949 with the Final match. Partizani were the defending champions, having won their first Albanian Cup last season. The 1949 cup was won by KF Partizani.

The rounds were played in a one-legged format. If the number of goals was equal, the match was decided by extra time and a penalty shootout, if necessary.

First round
Games were played on March, 1949*
 Results unknown.

Second round
Games were played on March, 1949*
 Results unknown.

Quarter-finals
In this round entered the eight winners from the previous round.

|}

Semi-finals
In this round entered the four winners from the previous round*

|}

 Results unknown.

Final

References

 Calcio Mondiale Web

External links
Official website 

Cup
1949 domestic association football cups
1949